Arcadius of Antioch was a Greek grammarian who flourished in the 2nd century CE. According to the Suda, he wrote treatises on orthography and syntax, and an onomasticon (vocabulary), described as "a wonderful production."

 (Peri tonon), an epitome of the major work of Herodian on general prosody in twenty books, was wrongly attributed to Arcadius; it is probably the work of Theodosius or a grammarian named Aristodemus. Though meager and carelessly assembled, it preserves the order of the original and so affords a foundation for its reconstruction.

References

External links
 Peri tonon, Edmund Henry Barker (ed.), Leipzig, 1820; Greek text with Latin commentary at the Internet archive

Ancient Greek grammarians
People from Antioch
2nd-century writers
Year of birth unknown
Year of death unknown